David Tate may refer to:

 David Tate (American football) (born 1964), former American football defensive back
 David Tate (actor) (1937–1996), British actor

See also
David Tait (disambiguation)